Ben Newnam (born April 18, 1991) is an American soccer player.

Career

College and amateur
Newnam played four years of college soccer at Wake Forest University between 2009 and 2012.

He also played in the USL Premier Development League for Carolina Dynamo and Reading United.

Professional career
Newnam signed with USL Pro club Charlotte Eagles in April 2013.

Newnam signed with United Soccer League side Louisville City FC in January 2016.

Newnam joined USL side San Antonio FC on December 23, 2016.

References

External links
 Official website

1991 births
Living people
American soccer players
Wake Forest Demon Deacons men's soccer players
North Carolina Fusion U23 players
Reading United A.C. players
Charlotte Eagles players
Colorado Rapids players
Charlotte Independence players
Pittsburgh Riverhounds SC players
Louisville City FC players
San Antonio FC players
Association football defenders
Soccer players from North Carolina
USL League Two players
USL Championship players
Major League Soccer players